Lauren Georgia Smith (born 6 October 1996) is an Australian cricketer who plays as a right-arm off break bowler and right-handed batter. Smith was selected to play her first Women's National Cricket League (WNCL) match for the New South Wales Breakers at the age of 18. In her debut WNCL match she took four wickets for 36 runs in her ten overs.

Smith previously played for the Sydney Sixers in the Women's Big Bash League before being recruited to play for the Sydney Thunder ahead of the 2020–21 season. She also had a stint with Lancashire in 2016 and with Suffolk in 2022. Later in 2022, she joined the South East Stars squad, scoring 73* and taking 2/20 on debut against North West Thunder.

References

External links

Lauren Smith at Cricket Australia

1996 births
Living people
Cricketers from Sydney
Australian expatriate sportspeople in England
Australian women cricketers
New South Wales Breakers cricketers
Sydney Sixers (WBBL) cricketers
Sydney Thunder (WBBL) cricketers
Lancashire women cricketers
Suffolk women cricketers
South East Stars cricketers